Paulo Antônio Skaf (born August 7, 1955) is a Brazilian entrepreneur and politician, affiliated to Republicans (in Portuguese: Republicanos) of São Paulo.

Skaf served as President of the Federação das Indústrias do Estado de São Paulo (FIESP), of Serviço Social da Indústria (SESI-SP), of Serviço Nacional de Aprendizagem Industrial (Senai-SP), of Instituto Roberto Simonsen (IRS) and of Serviço Brasileiro de Apoio às Micro e Pequenas Empresas (SEBRAE-SP). He is also the first Vice-President of Confederação Nacional da Indústria (CNI).

Skaf has been active in industrial businesses entities, such as Confederação Nacional da Indústria (CNI), at Sindicato das Indústrias de Fiação e Tecelagem do Estado de São Paulo (Sinditêxtil) and at Associação Brasileira da Indústria Têxtil e de Confecção (ABIT). Lastly he was also member of the Conselho de Desenvolvimento Econômico e Social (CDES) of the President.

Biography

Paulo Skaf was born at Vila Mariana, a neighborhood of São Paulo, son of Lebanese immigrant and prominent entrepreneur in the textile Antoine Skaf and Clotilde Habeyche Skaf. He attended the Colégio Elvira Brandão and finished his high school at Colégio Santo Américo. He studied Business Administration at Universidade Presbiteriana Mackenzie but dropped out before completion.

In 1978, he met Luzia Helena Pamplona de Menezes, who arrived at the same year. They have five sons, Paulo, André, Raphael, Gabriel, and Antoine, and three grandchildren.

In his teenage years, he started working with his father, but his entrepreneurial spirit soon flourished and made him follow his own steps. Dedicated in textile, his mid-sized factories was located at the east side of São Paulo – one at Ipiranga, another at Mooca and one at Belenzinho. In order to consolidate all in one unit, years later, it was relocated to Pindamonhangaba, at Vale do Paraíba.

The arrival of the Koreans in Brazil and the downfall of his company's products competitivity, he felt the necessity of a drastic measure and redirect his business. He then focused his investments to industrial construction sector.  It was only after his activities in the real estate businesses that he realized another one of his passions: politics.

Business career 
Alongside his business interests, Skaf is known his roles in the textile sector, at the Sindicato das Indústrias de Fiação e Tecelagem do Estado de São Paulo (Sinditêxtil) and at the Associação Brasileira da Indústria Têxtil e de Confecção. As a leader for two mandates, he developed the organisations into an important part in the fashion industry. On September 27, 2004, he was elected, in his first mandate, as the President at Federação das Indústrias do Estado de São Paulo, at Ciesp, at Sesi-SP, at Senai-SP and at last for the Instituto Roberto Simonsen (IRS).

At FIESP, his management focused on research into Brazil's sustainable growth. The aim was to seek structural changes to provide better public services to society, mainly at education, health and security. As the head of the institution, Skaf innovated with the implementation of full time education and articulated the integration between high school and technical school. Nowadays, Sesi_SP is the major institution of private school in the country. In 2013, the number of enrollment at Senai-SP, surpassed 1,2 Millions and 150 thousands at Sesi-SP.

Skaf also actively worked on tax exemption, debureaucratization of processes, increasing the investments of infrastructure and expand external markets. Created a “entrepreneurial diplomacy” policy, which helped in the formation of qualified human resources to operate in private sector with international matters and micro and small businesses act in the external Market, decisively contributing in the international insertion of Brazil.

Another striking moment in Skaf's trajectory was the action moved against the CPMF (tax applied in financial transaction). This taxation was implemented in 1997 and abolished in 2007 after a fierce dispute in the Senate.  In São Paulo, Skaf worked hard in order that the matter was discussed at specialized sector. On December 13, 2007, Skaf was able to celebrate the end of CPMF as the Senate declared its end from December 31 of the same year and preventing its reestablishment in 2008. An official notice from FIESP on behalf of Skaf, declared a “victory of Brasil”.

It was also under his management in which FIESP led a campaign for two achievements: the creation of the General law for micro and small businesses and de dismiss of taxes over products derived from wheat, which led to a decrease in price of bread and pasta.

In 2009, one of the most successful actions of Paulo Skaf was the decrease of 30% over spreads, easing the obtainment of bank credit, therefore, generating employment and production. Another highlight was the leadership at FIESP, defending the receipt, from exporters, of credits related to the legal reimbursement of IPI provided at external sales.

In 2011, the campaign Energia a Preço Justo (Fair price for energy), with the aim to mobilize the population against the renovation without biddings from overdue energy companies. The result was a discount of 20% in the energy bills of Brazilians, announced by Brazilian government in 2013. This campaign was able to generate an economy of 30 billions per year.

From June 2011 to April 2012, FIESP promoted a strong mobilization towards the provisional measure to put an end at the port war, resolution nº 72, and that it should be approved by the senate. This measure proposed the annulment of tax breaks over imported products via discount over the Imposto sobre Circulação de Mercadoria e Serviços (ICMS) putting an end to the so-called port war.

Another important achievement for the industry was the dismiss of payroll. After two years fighting,  was enacted in 2013 the law that deprives taxation of social security contributions of employers in certain sectors, calculated over the payroll, which creates less pressure on the costs of those who produce and more Jobs for those who work.

In 2013, FIESP campaigned for the approval of the provisional measure of the Ports, which provides for the modernization of port facilities, stimulating competition and moving lower priced cargoes.

Also in 2013, FIESP and CIESP were able to stop the IPTU's abusive increase of an average of 55% in the residences and 88% in the commerce in the city of São Paulo, which was well above the readjustment of the workers in the period, with a preliminary injunction in justice. Thus, the city of São Paulo was only able to correct the IPTU for annual inflation.

Political career 

Skaf's political career dates back to the 1970s, when, as a young man, he decided to join CPOR. "My vocation has always been to serve Brazil." He once said in an interview. In addition to the business, Skaf was distinguished by his leadership as a leader of entities in the sector, such as the Sinditêxtil and the Associação Brasileira da Indústria Têxtil e de Confecção (ABIT).

On September 27, 2004, he assumed the Presidency of the Federation of Industries of the State of São Paulo (Fiesp). He also took over Ciesp, Sesi-SP, Senai-SP and Instituto Roberto Simonsen (IRS), as well as being the first vice-president of CNI. He was also a member of the Conselho de Desenvolvimento Econômico e Social (CDES - Economic and Social Development Council) of the Presidency.

At Fiesp, his management adopted measures such as the implementation of full-time education and the articulation of secondary education with the technician. This year, Sesi is the largest private education network in the country. In 2009, 1.2 million enrollments were registered in Senai-SP and 120 thousand in regular Sesi-SP education. Aside from this, Skaf also worked to tax exemptions, to debureaucratize processes, to increase investments in infrastructure, to expand foreign markets (created the "Business Diplomacy").

On September 30, 2009, Skaf joined the PSB, and in the 2010 elections, he applied for the PSB to government of São Paulo. Despite the socialist legend, Skaf presented neoliberal proposals such as the collection of tuition fees in state public universities. He was ranked 4th with 1,038,430 votes (4.56% of the valid votes), behind Geraldo Alckmin (PSDB) - 1st place and elected in the first round with 11,519,314 votes (50.63% of the valid votes) Of Aloizio Mercadante (PT) - 2nd place with 8.016.866 votes (35.23% of valid votes) - and Celso Russomano (PP) - 3rd place with 1,233,897 votes (5.42% of valid votes).

After invitation from Michel Temer, Skaf left the PSB in early 2011 and joined PMDB in São Paulo. Skaf was again a candidate for the government of São Paulo in 2014, now by the PMDB, obtaining the 2nd place with 4,594,708 votes (21.53% of the valid ones) - behind only the candidate for re-election Geraldo Alckmin (PSDB), who obtained 12,230,807 Votes (57.31% of the valid ones.

Honors 

In August 2013, Skaf, as the President of FIESP, received a medal of Judicial Merit from Tribunal de Justiça do Estado (State Court of Justice - TJ-SP). In May 2014, Skaf received on July 9th Medal in the Chamber of Araçatuba. The honor was granted by FIESP's investments in SESI schools in the city.

Skaf has already received medals, commendations and decorations, such as:

 Order of Rio Branco; 
 National Order of Merit, of the Republic of Colombia; 
 Order for Merit for Distinguished Services, of the Republic of Peru; 
 Order of Military Merit, of the Brazilian Army; 
 Order of Naval Merit, of the Brazilian Navy; 
 Order of Aeronautical Merit, of the Aeronautics of Brazil; 
 Anhanguera Order of Merit, of the Government of the State of Goiás.

Skaf has also received more than 50 titles of citizenship granted by the City Councils of municipalities in the various regions of the State of São Paulo.

See also

 FIESP
 CIESP
 SESI
 SENAI

References

External links
 Espaço da Presidência Fiesp
 

|-

Republicans (Brazil) politicians
1955 births
Brazilian businesspeople
Businesspeople from São Paulo
Living people
Brazilian people of Lebanese descent
Brazilian Democratic Movement politicians
Brazilian Socialist Party politicians